Justice Hazard may refer to:

Carder Hazard (1734–1792), associate justice of the Rhode Island Supreme Court
Jeffrey Hazard (1762–1840), associate justice of the Rhode Island Supreme Court
Joseph Hazard (1728–1790), associate justice of the Rhode Island Supreme Court